USS LST-178 was a  in the United States Navy during World War II. She was later transferred to the Royal Navy and renamed HMS LST-178. In 1946, she was again handed over to the Egyptian Navy to be renamed ENS Aka.

Construction and commissioning 
LST-178 was laid down on 6 February 1943 at Missouri Valley Bridge and Iron Co., Evansville, Indiana. Launched on 23 May 1943 and commissioned on 21 June 1943.

Service in the United States Navy 
During World War II, LST-178 was assigned to the Europe-Africa-Middle East theater. She took part in the Convoy UGS-36 on 1 April 1944.

She also took part in the Invasion of Southern France from 15 August to 25 September 1944.

The ship was then transferred to the Royal Navy after her decommissioning on 24 December 1944.

Service in the Royal Navy 
HMS LST-178 was commissioned on 24 December 1944.

On 24 February 1945, she made a trip to Patras, Greece loaded with Army personnel and vehicles bound for Corfu. On the same day, two explosions occurred aboard the ship, one port forward and followed by another one on her port side aft. She was able to return to Patras by her own power.

After close inspection, she was repaired and declared a total lost, then towed to Egypt. On 28 May 1945, she was decommissioned by the Royal Navy.

Service in the Egyptian Navy 
The Egyptian Navy acquired the ship in November 1946 and renamed to ENS Aka.

During the Suez Crisis on 1 November 1956, she was sunk by Royal Air Force while she was being prepared to be scuttled near Lake Timsah as a blockship. The ship was later refloated, beached and abandoned.

Awards 
LST-178 have earned the following awards:

American Campaign Medal 
Europe-Africa-Middle East Campaign Medal (2 battle stars)
World War II Victory Medal
Navy Occupation Service Medal (with Asia clasp)

Citations

Sources 
 
 
 
 

LST-1-class tank landing ships
Ships built in Evansville, Indiana
World War II amphibious warfare vessels of the United States
1943 ships
LST-1-class tank landing ships of the Royal Navy
Amphibious warfare vessels of the Egyptian Navy
Maritime incidents in February 1945
Maritime incidents in 1956
Ships sunk by British aircraft